Toungo is a town and Local Government Area of Adamawa State, Nigeria.

Local Government Areas in Adamawa State